Omega hydroxy acids (ω-hydroxycarboxylic acids) are a class of naturally occurring straight-chain aliphatic organic acids n carbon atoms long with a carboxyl group at position 1 (the starting point for the family of carboxylic acids), and a hydroxyl at terminal position n where n > 3. The C16 and C18 omega hydroxy acids 16-hydroxy palmitic acid and 18-hydroxy stearic acid are key monomers of cutin in the plant cuticle. The polymer cutin is formed by interesterification of omega hydroxy acids and derivatives of them that are substituted in mid-chain, such as 10,16-dihydroxy palmitic acid. Only the epidermal cells of plants synthesize cutin.

Omega hydroxy fatty acids also occur in animals. Cytochrome P450 (CYP450) microsome ω-hydroxylases such as CYP4A11, CYP4A22, CYP4F2, and CYP4F3 in humans, Cyp4a10 and Cyp4a12 in mice, and Cyp4a1, Cyp4a2, Cyp4a3, and Cyp4a8 in rats metabolize arachidonic acid and many arachidonic acid metabolites to their corresponding omega hydroxyl products. This metabolism of arachidonic acid produces 20-hydroxyarachidonic acid (i.e. 20-hydroxyeicosatetraeonic acid or 20-HETE), a bioactive product involved in various physiological and pathological processes; and this metabolism of certain bioactive arachidonic acid metabolites such as leukotriene B4 and 5-hydroxyicosatetraenoic acid produces 20-hydroxylated products which are 100- to 1,000-fold weaker than, and therefore represents the inactivation of, their respective precursors.

List
The definition for "omega" includes number of carbons (C#) greater or equal to three. Lower numbers are included here to match the formula pattern CnH2nO3.

See also 
 Alpha hydroxy acid
 Beta hydroxy acid

References 

Hydroxy acids
Plant physiology

ar:حمض هيدروكسي